General the Hon. Edward Pyndar Lygon, CB (3 April 1786 – 11 November 1860) was a senior officer in the British Army and a Member of Parliament.

Background
Edward was the fourth son of William Lygon, 1st Earl Beauchamp, by his wife Catharine, the only daughter of James Denn. An elder brother was Henry Lygon, 4th Earl Beauchamp who also became an army general. Edward was educated at Westminster School and entered the British Army in 1803 as a cornet in the 2nd Life Guards.

Military career
He was made lieutenant in 1805, captain in 1808 and major and fought in the Peninsular War from 1812 to 1814. He was made major and lieutenant-colonel in 1815 and commanded the 2nd Life Guards at the Battle of Waterloo. He was awarded CB on 22 June 1815.

Further promotions as a staff officer were to lieutenant-colonel in 1818, colonel in 1822, major-general in 1837  and lieutenant-general in 1846. He was appointed Inspector General of Cavalry.

He was given the colonelcy of the 13th Regiment of Light Dragoons in January 1845, a position he held until his death. He was made a full general on 20 June 1854.

Parliamentary career
In 1818 Lygon was elected to Parliament for Callington, sitting until 1820. Although re-elected in March 1820 he was unseated on petition the following June.

Death and legacy
He died unmarried at his London home in 1860, although he also owned Spring Hill in Broadway, Worcestershire.

The Lygon Arms in Chipping Campden was named after him.

Lygon Street in Melbourne, Australia, was also named in his honour.

References

|-

1786 births
1860 deaths
People educated at Westminster School, London
British Life Guards officers
Companions of the Order of the Bath
British Army generals
British Army personnel of the Peninsular War
People of the Battle of Waterloo
Members of the Parliament of the United Kingdom for Callington
Younger sons of earls
UK MPs 1818–1820
UK MPs 1820–1826
Edward